The Șipoaia is a right tributary of the river Timiș in Brașov County, Romania. It flows into the Timiș in Dâmbul Morii.

References

Rivers of Romania
Rivers of Brașov County